Vajin Vrh is a village in Croatia, under the Josipdol township, in Karlovac County.

References

Geography of Croatia
Populated places in Karlovac County